Leucothoe is a genus of amphipods in the family Leucothoidae. It contains the following species:

Leucothoe acanthopus Schellenberg, 1928
Leucothoe acutilobata Ledoyer, 1978
Leucothoe adelphe White & Thomas, 2009
Leucothoe affinis Stimpson, 1856
Leucothoe alata J. L. Barnard, 1959
Leucothoe alcyone Imbach, 1967
Leucothoe angusticoxa (Ledoyer, 1972)
Leucothoe ashleyae Thomas & Klebba, 2006
Leucothoe assimilis J. L. Barnard, 1974
Leucothoe atosi Bellan-Santini, 2007
Leucothoe ayrtonia Bellan-Santini, 1997
Leucothoe barana Thomas & Klebba, 2007
Leucothoe basilobata Serejo, 1998
Leucothoe bidens Hirayama, 1985
Leucothoe boolpooli J. L. Barnard, 1974
Leucothoe bova White & Thomas, 2009
Leucothoe brevidigitata Miers, 1884
Leucothoe brunonis Krapp-Schickel & Menioui, 2005
Leucothoe campi Mateus & Mateus, 1986
Leucothoe cheiriserra Serejo, 1998
Leucothoe commensalis Haswell, 1879
Leucothoe crassimana Kossmann, 1880
Leucothoe crenatipalma Ledoyer, 1972
Leucothoe ctenochasma Moore, 1987
Leucothoe ctenochir K. H. Barnard, 1925
Leucothoe dentata Ledoyer, 1973
Leucothoe dentitelson (Chevreux, 1925)
Leucothoe diemenensis Haswell, 1879
Leucothoe dolichoceras K. H. Barnard, 1916
Leucothoe eltoni Thomas, 2015
Leucothoe epideomos White & Thomas, 2009
Leucothoe eumilli White & Thomas, 2009
Leucothoe euryonyx (Walker, 1901)
Leucothoe flammosa Thomas & Klebba, 2007
Leucothoe furina (Savigny, 1816)
Leucothoe garifunae Thomas & Klebba, 2007
Leucothoe gavialis Myers, 1985
Leucothoe germanalcyone Hirayama, 1992
Leucothoe goowera J. L. Barnard, 1974
Leucothoe grandimanus Stimpson, 1853
Leucothoe hendrickxi Winfield & Alvarez, 2009
Leucothoe hipposideros White & Thomas, 2009
Leucothoe hornelli (Walker, 1904)
Leucothoe hyhelia J. L. Barnard, 1965
Leucothoe incisa (Robertson, 1892)
Leucothoe kensleyi Thomas & Klebba, 2005
Leucothoe laevipalma White & Thomas, 2009
Leucothoe laticoxa Ledoyer, 1978
Leucothoe laurensi Thomas & Ortiz, 1995
Leucothoe leptosa Serejo, 1998
Leucothoe lihue J. L. Barnard, 1970
Leucothoe lilljeborgi Boeck, 1861
Leucothoe madrasana Sivaprakasam, 1969
Leucothoe makrommatos White & Thomas, 2009
Leucothoe mateusae (Barnard & Karaman, 1991)
Leucothoe micronesiae J. L. Barnard, 1965
Leucothoe minima Schellenberg, 1925
Leucothoe minuscula Schellenberg, 1938
Leucothoe nagatai Ishimaru, 1985
Leucothoe neptunea Moore, 1987
Leucothoe oboa Karaman, 1971
Leucothoe occulta Krapp-Schickel, 1975
Leucothoe odontiskos White & Thomas, 2009
Leucothoe orkneyi Holman & Watling, 1983
Leucothoe pachycera Della Valle, 1893
Leucothoe pacifica Nagata, 1963
Leucothoe panpulco J. L. Barnard, 1961
Leucothoe pollex White & Thomas, 2009
Leucothoe predenticulata Ledoyer, 1978
Leucothoe procera Bate, 1857
Leucothoe richiardii Lesson, 1865
Leucothoe rostrata Chevreux, 1908
Leucothoe rudicula White & Thomas, 2009
Leucothoe safiae Lyons & Myers, 1991
Leucothoe saron Thomas & Klebba, 2007
Leucothoe serrata White & Thomas, 2009
Leucothoe serraticarpa Della Valle, 1893
Leucothoe sparsa White & Thomas, 2009
Leucothoe spinicarpa (Abildgaard, 1789)
Leucothoe spinulosa Chevreux, 1919-20
Leucothoe squalidens Ledoyer, 1984
Leucothoe stegoceras Walker, 1904
Leucothoe stylifera Stimpson, 1856
Leucothoe tarte J. L. Barnard, 1974
Leucothoe thula White & Thomas, 2009
Leucothoe tolkieni G. Vinogradov, 1990
Leucothoe trailli Thomson, 1882
Leucothoe tridens Stebbing, 1888
Leucothoe ubouhu Thomas & Klebba, 2007
Leucothoe undulata White & Thomas, 2009
Leucothoe urospinosa Serejo, 1998
Leucothoe uschakovi Gurjanova, 1951
Leucothoe venetiarum Giordani-Soika, 1950
Leucothoe wuriti Thomas & Klebba, 2007

References

Gammaridea
Malacostraca genera